In the United States Virgin Islands, law regulates the sale, possession, and use of firearms and ammunition. As the U.S. Virgin Islands are an unincorporated territory of the United States, many U.S. federal laws apply, as well as Constitutional rulings and protections.

Summary table

Licensing process
The U.S. Virgin Islands have a stringent and restrictive licensing process to purchase or carry a firearm. A person must be 21 to get a non-carry weapons license, along with several other requirements. Applicants must pay $75 licensing fee, submit a signed application, be fingerprinted and photographed, and be of good moral character. That process is just for a permit to purchase firearms to store in a residence or business, and not for a concealed carry permit. There are six types of licenses: 
 Blue, Business Protection
 Yellow, Home protection and handguns only
 Gray, farming and long guns only
 White, all active law enforcement
 Pink, current and retired law enforcement, personal protection, and special circumstances
 Green, target shooting, sports use and home protection

To qualify, the applicant must belong to a gun club. To acquire a concealed carry permit, or "Pink" permit, a person must meet a specific set of criteria. To apply, the applicant must either be a government employee, valuable goods carrier, firearms manufacturer, or be a bona fide resident or business person of the islands. The applicant must prove a good reason to fear death or great injury to person or property and present at least two affidavits from credible persons who attest to that need. Due to this process, in most cases concealed carry permit applications are denied for normal resident applicants unless in grave circumstances.

As a result of the SCOTUS Bruen Decision (6/22), the police must issue a carry permit to anyone who is not already barred from owning a firearm.

References

United States Virgin Islands law
United States Virgin Islands